Tito Gómez (born Humberto Luis Gómez Rivera April 9, 1948 in Juana Díaz, Puerto Rico – died June 11, 2007 in Cali, Colombia) was a Puerto Rican salsa singer.

Group career
His musical career started at the age of 15 singing with the Conjunto Antoanetti before joining the Sonora Ponceña as co-lead vocalist in 1967. In 1973 Ponceña trumpeter Joe Rodriguez, percussionist Mikey Ortiz and Gómez broke away and formed La Terrifica. Later, Gómez joined Ray Barretto's band sharing vocal duties with Ruben Blades most notably on the 1975 Barretto album.
by Gómez and Ruben Blades. The following year he returned to La Sonora Ponceña where he remained for two years. In 1979 he moved to Venezuela to join La Amistad, a short-lived project with former members of La Dimension Latina. In 1982 he went solo once again and returned to Puerto Rico.

In 1985, he joined Colombian band Grupo Niche, relocated to Colombia, and sang lead vocals with them for eight years.

Solo career and death
He went solo in the early 1990s making seven albums in nine years  for Miami-based Musical Productions. His debut Un Nuevo Horizonte included a hit single "Dejala" featuring Tito Rojas.

Gómez's musical career came to a temporary end when he was convicted for transporting counterfeit money in the United States in 2000, serving time in a federal prison. Upon release in 2004 went back to Puerto Rico to his hometown Juana Diaz and relaunched his solo career. He was in the middle of a reunion tour of Colombia with Grupo Niche when he died of a heart attack on June 11, 2007 in Cali, Colombia.

References

1948 births
2007 deaths
People from Juana Díaz, Puerto Rico
20th-century Puerto Rican male singers
Salsa musicians